Danobat is a cooperative company that is mainly aimed at the manufacture of grinding machines, and lathes. It is located in the town of Elgoibar in the province of Gipuzkoa in the Basque Country in Spain.  Danobat, is part of the industrial branch of the Mondragon Corporation, has a 65-year track record in the development of high-precision grinding machines and lathes and invests between 8% and 10% of its income in innovation.

It is one of Europe's leading machine tool manufacturers, employs more than 600 people and has an annual turnover of around 130 million euros.

Danobat was founded in the industrial town of Elgoibar in 1954, but currently the company's employees are spread out over all branches worldwide.

The name Danobat is a contraction of the Basque words "danok" and "bat", translatable as "All One".

All workers are depositories of the property under equal conditions, on the basis of one-member, one-vote in the General Assembly. The member workers form part of the executive bodies of Danobat (Board of Management and General Assembly) on an equal basis and participate in decision-making and management. Membership of the executive bodies is renewed every four years.

History of Danobat
 1954: Danobat was set up with the aim of offering external grinding operations.
 1956: Founding of Construcciones Mecánicas Eguzki.
 1962: Founding of the company Acme-Deva.
 1969: Merger of Danobat, Eguzki and Acme-Deva under the name of Danobat S. Coop.
 1983: Founding of the Debako Group by the companies Danobat, Soraluce, Goiti and Txurtxil.
 1992: Founding of Danobatgroup as a strategic group in the sector and a continuation of the Debako Group; inclusion in the Mondragon Cooperative Corporation, within the industrial division.
 1992–1997: Danobatgroup set up new sales and service offices in China, Germany, France, Japan, Italy, US and Brazil.
 2002: Acquisition of the German company Overbeck.
 2003: Acquisition of the British company Newall.
 2008: Merger of cooperatives Danobat and Lealde.
 2011: Merger of cooperatives Danobat and Estarta Rectificadora.
 2012: The cooperatives Danobat Railway Systems and Dano-Rail merge.
 2013: Danobat Railway Systems becomes part of Danobat.
 2014: Start of joint venture between Danobat and the American company Marathon.
 2015: Acquisition of the company Plantool OY by Danobat.
 2019: Acquisition of Hembrug Machine Tools

Environmental management
With the support of Ihobe and Invema, in 2001 an ISO team was set up with other companies from the Danobat Group and MCC to achieve the ISO 14001 certification in May 2002. The same year, Danobat was included in the EMAS register. The AENOR audits in May 2003 were successful and the Regional Ministry of Environment of the Basque Government granted the EMAS registration7 in October 2003.

Installations

Danobat has a strong international presence with production plants and service centres in Spain, Germany, Netherlands, Italy, United Kingdom and United States, as well as an important sales and service network covering 40 countries.

References

Basque companies
Worker cooperatives
Cooperatives in Spain
Mondragon Corporation
Machine tool builders
Spanish brands
Gipuzkoa